Star Anchor Hunt, was an Indian reality television show, hosted on Star News.

About the show
STAR News, the leading news channel from MCCS launched Star Anchor Hunt in the month of March, 2010. The show hunted for the best news talent in the country. The winners, one male and one female got a chance to be a TV news anchor with Star News.

People who wanted to participate had to register online and selected candidates were then invited for Audition rounds which takes place across 10 cities.: Indore, Nagpur, Allahabad, Lucknow, Mumbai, Patna, Delhi, Chandigarh, Ahmedabad and Jaipur.

Winners gets a chance to work with the channel and present a show and the morning headlines.

Star Anchor Hunt went on air starting from 7 June 2010 to 26 June 2010. Star News selected two anchors as star anchors in the grand finale and they were offered an assignment with Star News.

Judges
This show had 3 judges
- Tisca Chopra
- Deepak Chaurasia
- Chetan Bhagat

Winners
Akshay Shukla from Bilaspur and Meenakshi Kandwal from Delhi were winners of Star Anchor Hunt. They each won a contract with Star News and became news anchors on Star News.

References

External links
 

Indian reality television series
2010 Indian television series debuts